ICASSP, the International Conference on Acoustics, Speech, and Signal Processing, is an annual flagship conference organized of IEEE Signal Processing Society. All papers included in its proceedings have been indexed by Ei Compendex.

The first ICASSP was held in 1976 in Philadelphia, Pennsylvania based on the success of a conference in Massachusetts four years earlier that had focused specifically on speech signals.

As ranked by Google Scholar's h-index metric in 2016, ICASSP has the highest h-index of any conference in Signal Processing field.

Also, It is considered a high level conference in signal processing and, for example, obtained an 'A1' rating from the Brazilian ministry of education based on its H-index.

References 

IEEE conferences
Academic conferences
Computer science conferences
Signal processing conferences